An institutional referendum (or ) was held in Italy on 2 June 1946, a key event of contemporary Italian history. 

Until 1946, Italy was a kingdom ruled by the House of Savoy, reigning royal house of Italy since the national unification in 1861 and previously rulers of the Duchy of Savoy. However, in 1922 the rise of Benito Mussolini and the creation of the fascist regime, which eventually resulted in engaging Italy in World War II alongside Nazi Germany, considerably weakened the role of the monarchy.

Following a civil war and the Liberation of Italy from Axis troops in 1945, a popular referendum on the institutional form of the state was called the next year and resulted in voters choosing the replacement of the monarchy with a republic. A Constituent Assembly was elected on the same day. As with the simultaneous Constituent Assembly elections, the referendum was not held in the Julian March or South Tyrol, which were still under occupation by Allied forces pending a final settlement of the status of the territories.

Background

Democracy was not a new concept in Italian politics. The Kingdom of Sardinia had become a constitutional monarchy with the liberalizing reforms of King Charles Albert's famous Albertine Statute in 1848. Suffrage, initially limited to select citizens, was gradually expanded. In 1912 Giovanni Giolitti's government introduced universal suffrage for male citizens. In this period, the provisions of the Statute were often not observed. Instead, the elected Chamber and the Head of Government took major roles. At the beginning of the 20th century, many observers thought that, by comparison to other countries, Italy was developing in the direction of a modern democracy. Essential issues that needed to be resolved included the relationship of the Kingdom with the Roman Catholic Church.

A crisis arose in Italian society as a result of the First World War, social inequalities, and the consequent tension between Marxist and other left-wing parties on one side and conservative liberals on the other. This crisis led to the advent of fascism, which destroyed freedoms and civil rights and established a dictatorship, breaking the continuity of the still fragile parliamentary tradition. The support of the ruling class and especially of the monarchy was crucial for the seizure of power by Benito Mussolini. After Mussolini's March on Rome in October 1922, King Victor Emmanuel III refused to sign a decree to declare a state of siege and instead asked Mussolini to form a new government. The King's decision was within his powers under the Albertine Statute, but contrary to the parliamentary practices of the Italian liberal state, as the National Fascist Party had only a small minority of the parliamentary deputies.

After the invasion of Italy by Allied forces in 1943, the Grand Council of Fascism, with the co-operation of the King, overthrew Mussolini from power and established a new government headed by Marshal Pietro Badoglio. Germany, worried by the new government's intention to negotiate a separate peace with the Allies, invaded and occupied Northern Italy. In the Gran Sasso raid, or Operation Oak, German paratroopers rescued Mussolini from the hilltop hotel in which he had been imprisoned by the new government. Under pressure from Hitler, Mussolini then established a puppet state, the Italian Social Republic to administer the German-occupied territory, leading to Italy being split in two, each with its own government. In the North, Mussolini declared that the monarchy had been overthrown and began to establish a new republican state, with himself as Duce, but for practical purposes under the control of Karl Wolff and Rudolf Rahn. The Italian Social Republic had its seat of government in the town of Salò, so is commonly known as the Republic of Salo.

Southern Italy, meanwhile, remained nominally under the control of the new legitimist government of Badoglio, continuing to operate as the Kingdom of Italy. Rome descended into chaos, as fighting erupted between Mussolini loyalists and supporters of the new government, as well as leftist opponents of fascism who emerged from hiding. The King and the government left Rome to seek the protection of the Allied forces that occupied the South. With half of the Italian peninsula occupied by the Germans and the rest by the Allies, a return to civil rights was suspended due to the complete disorder in the country. The pre-Fascist-era parties had been formally disbanded, and so far as they still existed their activity was clandestine and limited, with no form of contact with most of the population. Consequently, the future relationships between these parties and the balance of power were left to be decided at a later, quieter time. However, some political forces organized the Italian Resistance, which enjoyed strong popular support. Almost all of the Resistance were anti-monarchists; nevertheless, a temporary alliance between them and the Badoglio government was created by the decision of Joseph Stalin and Palmiro Togliatti, secretary of the Italian Communist Party, to postpone the problem of the state organization and focus all efforts on the fight against Hitler's puppet state in the North.

At the end of the war, Italy was a severely damaged country, with innumerable victims, a destroyed economy, and a desperate general condition. The defeat left the country deprived of the Empire it had fought for in the past two decades and also occupied by foreign soldiers. For some years after 1945, internal politically motivated fighting continued.

The emergence of political forces to replace fascism could not occur until the internal conflict ended and elections could be held. After fighting had died down, a few months were needed before attention could be given to institutional matters. The first important question regarded the royal family, blamed by many for the fascist regime, the war, and the defeat.

Republican traditions in Italy traditionally hark back to the Roman Republic and the Medieval comunes, in which a wide spectrum of people took part in the business of government, but remained largely theoretical, as in the conclusion of Machiavelli's Il Principe. The struggle for a Republican Italy independent of foreign powers had been started by Giuseppe Mazzini in the 19th century. The movement Giustizia e Libertà, which continued the traditional Mazzinian ideology, was the second important force during the Resistance. It posed the question of the form of the state as a fundamental precondition to developing any further agreements with the other parties. Giustizia e Libertà joined the Comitato di Liberazione Nazionale (National Liberation Committee, CLN). The various competing political factions agreed that a popular referendum would be held to determine the future institutional form of the Italian State.

Abdication

As the Allies advanced through the peninsula, it became apparent that Victor Emmanuel III was too compromised by his earlier support of Mussolini to have any further role.  Accordingly, in April 1944 he turned over most of his powers to Crown Prince Umberto. When Rome was recaptured on 4 June 1944, Victor Emmanuel relinquished his remaining powers to Umberto and named him Lieutenant General of the Realm, making him the de facto regent.

However, Victor Emmanuel retained the title of king until his abdication in May 1946.  Umberto then formally ascended the throne as King Umberto II. Many historians have noted that the royal house had an interest in the abdication, finding convenient to have a popular king "on stage" at that crucial moment. Umberto was more acceptable to the Italian people, in part thanks to his young and elegant life-style, and partially because his figure presented a stark contrast to the old, rough Victor Emmanuel, seen as compromised with the fascist regime himself. Umberto was relatively well received by the people from the moment of his enthronement, even if his Belgian-born wife Marie-José was kept at some distance because of her foreign origins. He is commonly called Re di Maggio ('the May King'), in reference to his brief rule of only 34 days.

Referendum
On 25 June 1944, a decree by Crown Prince Umberto, issued in his capacity as Lieutenant General of the Realm, during Ivanoe Bonomi’s time as Prime Minister, prescribed that a Constitutional Assembly would be organized after the war to draft a constitution and to choose an institutional form for the Italian State.

The institutional debate accelerated in the spring of 1946:
 On 1 March, the De Gasperi government gave its approval for the definitive scope of the referendum to be Republic versus Monarchy;
 On 12 March, the government called 2 June 1946 as the date of the referendum and of the election of the Constituent Assembly;
 On 18 March, the King issued the decrees together with a letter in which he anticipated his intention to abdicate in favour of his son Umberto (who was named Lieutenant General); the date for abdication being the anniversary of the Allied forces’ entry into Rome;
 On 25 April, at the Christian Democracy congress, it was revealed that, after an internal investigation, the opinion of the members of the party was 60% in favour of the republic, 17% in favour of the monarchy, and 23% undecided;
 On 9 May, Victor Emanuel III abdicated and left Italy from Naples by ship, after a long meeting with Umberto. The Crown Prince then ascended the throne as Umberto II;
 On 10 May, early in the morning, Umberto II made his first public announcement as king. That afternoon, the government censured Admiral Raffaele de Courten, who had set aside a battle cruiser for Victor Emanuel's exile that was supposed to be used to bring home Italian prisoners. It was also decided that the traditional institutional formula by which any decree or sentence was released in the name of "N, King of Italy, by God's grace and the nation's will" (N, Re d'Italia, per grazia di Dio e volontà della nazione), would be reduced to the simpler "N, King of Italy" (N, Re d'Italia). Taking effect on the day Umberto became king, this act did not present a warm welcome for the new king, especially since the government had not given him advance notice of its intention. Nevertheless, the king's main powers were "frozen" pending the outcome of the referendum.

The political campaign for the referendum was punctuated by incidents, especially in northern Italy, where monarchists were attacked by both republicans and post-fascists of the Italian Social Republic. Following a second decree (decreto legge luogotenenziale 16 marzo 1946, n. 98), during the government of De Gasperi, a referendum was held on 2 June, which was later named a national holiday in honour of the vote, and 3 June 1946. The question was simple: "Republic or Monarchy?" ("Repubblica o monarchia?") 

Following Italian law, the results were checked by the Corte di Cassazione (the highest judicial Court at that time), as expected. A problem arose when the Court, itself divided between monarchists and republicans, provisionally declared a republican victory on 10 June, but postponed the final result to 18 June. To avoid the expected huge risk of riots due to the Court's delay, the government itself declared a republic and appointed De Gasperi as the provisional Head of State on 13 June.
The legality of this action (according to the law in force at the time) is debated, as the Corte di Cassazione already declared a republican victory, at the same time stating that further data was to be analysed.

Results

By district

The conservative, rural Mezzogiorno (southern Italy) region voted solidly for the monarchy (63.8%) while the more urbanised and industrialised Nord (northern Italy) voted equally firmly for a republic (66.2%).

By most populated city

Aftermath
The republic was formally proclaimed on 6 June 1946, ending Umberto II's brief 34-day reign as king. Umberto at first refused to accept what he called "the outrageous illegality" of the referendum, and took his deposition badly. In his last statement as king, Umberto refused to accept the republic, saying he was the victim of a coup d'état by his ministers and the referendum had been rigged against him. In response, Alcide De Gasperi, who became Acting President, replied in a press statement: "We must strive to understand the tragedy of someone who, after inheriting a military defeat and a disastrous complicity with dictatorship, tried hard in recent months to work with patience and good will towards a better future. But this final act of the thousand-year old House of Savoy must be seen as part of our national catastrophe; it is an expiation,  an expiation forced upon all of us, even those who have not shared directly in the guilt of the dynasty". 
“Dobbiamo sforzarci di comprendere il dramma di chi, dopo aver ereditato una sconfitta militare e una disastrosa complicità con la dittatura, si è sforzato in questi mesi di lavorare con pazienza e buona volontà verso un futuro migliore. Ma questo ultimo atto del millenario  vecchia Casa Savoia deve essere vista come parte della nostra catastrofe nazionale; è un'espiazione, un'espiazione imposta a tutti noi, anche a coloro che non hanno partecipato direttamente alla colpa della dinastia". Some monarchists advocated using force to prevent a republic from being proclaimed, even at the risk of civil war, but Mack Smith wrote that: "Common sense and patriotism saved Umberto from accepting such counsel". Umberto rejected the advice that he should go to Naples and proclaim a rival government,  with the intention of starting a civil war in which the Army would presumably side with the House of Savoy, under the grounds that "My house united Italy. It will not divide it". The monarchy of the House of Savoy formally ended on 12 June 1946. Prime Minister Alcide de Gasperi assumed office as Italy's interim Head of State the same day. At about 15:00 on 13 June, Umberto left the Quirinal Palace for the last time with the servants all assembled in the courtyard to see him off, many in tears. At the Ciampino Airport in Rome, as Umberto boarded the aeroplane that was to take him to Lisbon, a Carabiniere grabbed him by the hand, shook it and said, in tears, "Your Majesty, we will never forget you!" (Vostra Maestà, non vi dimenticheremo mai!)

See also
 1946 Italian general election
 History of the Italian Republic

References

External links
 Gazzetta Ufficiale n. 134, 20 June 1946

History of the Italian Republic
1946 referendums
1946 elections in Italy
1946
Monarchy referendums
June 1946 events in Europe